The women's 15 km Free competition of the 2014 Winter Paralympics was held at Laura Biathlon & Ski Complex near Krasnaya Polyana, Sochi. The sitting 12 km competition took place on 9 March 2014 and the standing and visually impaired competition took place on 10 March 2014.

Medal table

Standing

Sitting (12km)

Visually Impaired

See also
Cross-country skiing at the 2014 Winter Olympics

References

Women's 15 km Free
Para